Ignatius Chung Wang (born February 27, 1934) is a Chinese-born American bishop of the Roman Catholic Church.  He served as an auxiliary bishop of the Archdiocese of San Francisco in California from 2002 to 2009. Wang is the first Asian-American and Chinese-American to be appointed as a Catholic bishop.

Biography

Early life 
Ignatius Wang was born in Beijing in what was then the Republic of China on February 27, 1934.  He attended Catholic schools in the former British Colony of Hong Kong, then started his studies for the priesthood at the Regional Seminary for South China in Hong Kong.

Priesthood 
On July 4, 1959, Wang was ordained into the priesthood for the Prefecture of Kienow in China at the Church of St. Francis of Assisi in Hong Kong. However, the People's Republic of China refused to allow Wang to serve as a priest in Kienow.  

In 1962, Wang began studies in Rome, receiving a Doctor of Canon Law degree. His first assignment was as a parish priest and vicar general of the Diocese of Saint George's in Grenada.

In 1974, the Vatican allowed Wang to transfer to San Francisco, the home of his sister and her children. When she died of cancer, Wang became the children's guardian.  Wang's first assignment in the Archdiocese of San Francisco was as parochial vicar for some of the parishes.

n 1981, Wang was appointed as director of the Office of Chinese Catholic Ministry. He initiated a ritual blessing of ancestors at the Chinese New Year's Mass. In 1982, he was posted as pastor of St. Francis of Assisi Parish in San Francisco, becoming the first Chinese-American Catholic pastor in San Francisco. He also became a member of the archdiocesan Tribunal and coordinator of the Chinese Apostolate.

In 1989, Pope John Paul II named Wang as a prelate of honor with the title of monsignor.

Auxiliary Bishop of San Francisco 
On December 13, 2002, John Paul II appointed Wang as an auxiliary bishop of the Archdiocese of San Francisco and titular bishop of Sitipa.  He was consecrated by Cardinal Levada on January 30, 2003.

On May 16, 2009, Pope Benedict XVI received Wang's letter of resignation as auxiliary bishop of San Francisco, having reached the mandatory retirement age of 75 for bishops.

See also
 

 Catholic Church hierarchy
 Catholic Church in the United States
 Historical list of the Catholic bishops of the United States
 List of Catholic bishops of the United States
 Lists of patriarchs, archbishops, and bishops

References

External links
 Roman Catholic Archdiocese of San Francisco Official Site

Episcopal succession

21st-century American Roman Catholic titular bishops
Chinese emigrants to the United States
Roman Catholic Archdiocese of San Francisco
People from Beijing
1934 births
Living people
Roman Catholic titular bishops of Sitipa